Terza Posizione was a short-lived neo-fascist political movement founded in Rome in 1978. The group published a journal, also called Terza Posizione which promoted Third Position politics. It was formed by teenagers and students from a previous group called Lotta Studentesca.

See also
 Nuclei Armati Rivoluzionari
 Costruiamo l'azione

References

Further reading

1978 establishments in Italy
Factions of the Years of Lead (Italy)
Modern history of Italy
Neo-fascist organisations in Italy
Neo-fascist terrorism
Third Position
Syncretic political movements